Talking Union is a 1941 album by the Almanac Singers: Millard Lampell, Lee Hays and Pete Seeger. It is an enduring collection of working man's anthems that have been passed down through generations of laborers. Liner notes include an introduction by Pete Seeger and song explanations. In 2010 it was selected by the Library of Congress as an addition to the National Recording Registry, which selects recordings annually that are "culturally, historically, or aesthetically significant".

In 1955 the album was rereleased on Folkways Records as The Original Talking Union & Other Union Songs, expanded with seven songs recorded in 1955 by Pete Seeger and a chorus dubbed "the Song Swappers" that included Erik Darling, later of The Weavers, and Mary Travers, later of Peter, Paul and Mary.

Track listing

References 

Almanac Singers albums
1941 albums
United States National Recording Registry recordings
Smithsonian Folkways albums
Keynote Records albums
United States National Recording Registry albums